Sean Progar-Jackson (born June 7, 1990) is a former American football outside linebacker. He was signed by the New York Jets as an undrafted free agent in 2013. He played college football at Northern Illinois.

Early years
He attended Glenbrook South High School in Glenview, Illinois. He was a three-time all-conference selection who earned all-state honors in his senior season and was an all-area selection as a junior in high school. He was named twice as the team's most valuable defensive player. He recorded a total of 40 sacks and forced 12 fumbles in three seasons while in high school.

College career

Northern Illinois
He finished college with a total of 169 tackles, 24.5 sacks, 5 forced fumbles, 5 pass deflections and one interception.

Redshirt freshman season
He was a redshirt freshman and sat out the entire 2008 season. He was selected as the team's defensive work team player of the year.

Freshman season
In his freshman year, he had 30 tackles, 6 sacks, 2 forced fumbles and one pass deflection. He earned freshman of the year honors with Northern Illinois as well as being selected as a Freshman All-American.

Sophomore season
In his sophomore year, he recorded 38 tackles, 4 sacks and one pass deflection. He was selected to the first-team All Mid-American Conference team following the conclusion of the season.

Junior season
In his junior year, he had 52 tackles, 5.5 sacks, one forced fumble and one pass deflection. He was selected to the second-team All Mid-American Conference team. He was selected as the  NIU Defensive Lineman of the Year by the coaching staff.

Senior season
In his senior year, he had 49 tackles, a career-high 8.5 sacks, one interception, 2 forced fumble and 2 pass deflections. He was selected to the first-team All-MAC team following his senior season.

Professional career

New York Jets
On May 12, 2013, he signed with the New York Jets as undrafted free agent. He spent time on the active roster and practice squad before later playing for several other NFL teams.

References

External links
Northern Illinois bio 
New York Jets bio

1990 births
Living people
American football outside linebackers
Northern Illinois Huskies football players
New York Jets players
Players of American football from Illinois
People from Park Ridge, Illinois